Buyé Beach (Spanish: Playa Buyé) is a beach in southwestern Puerto Rico, in the municipality of Cabo Rojo. The beach is popular with locals due to its soft, light beige-colored sand, its calm waters, and its relaxed and secluded, yet family-friendly, atmosphere. It is located next to the small Buyé Resort which offers parking (for $3), food kiosks and restrooms for visitors to the beach.

Other activities in addition to swimming are snorkeling, fishing, diving, paddle boarding and jet ski rentals. There are also picnic areas, gazebos for rent, gift shops with arts and crafts, and showers and changing rooms.

Getting there 
From PR-2 take the exit to Cabo Rojo to PR-100 and follow the directions to Playa Buyé / PR-307. Drive on route 307 until Kilometer 4.8 where there is a right exit to the beach along Calle Buyé. In addition to the parking offered by Buyé Resort, there is also free parking available along Calle Buyé. To get to the beach from Calle Buyé go to the end of the street through the gate at the end of the dirt road which offers access to the beach.

Gallery

See also 
 List of beaches in Puerto Rico
 Tourism in Puerto Rico

References

External links 
 Discovering Playa Buyé - Puerto Rico DayTrips
 Playa Buye (Buye Beach) – Cabo Rojo, Puerto Rico
 Playa Buyé, Puerto Rico - Tripadvisor

Beaches of Puerto Rico
Cabo Rojo, Puerto Rico